Sewell may refer to:

Sewell (name), a surname and given name, including lists of people with the name
Sewell, Bedfordshire
Sewell, Chile
Sewell, New Jersey
Sewell's Point, Norfolk, Virginia, United States
22815 Sewell, an asteroid

See also
Sewall, British Columbia, Canada, sometimes misspelled Sewell
Sewall, a surname
Seawell, a surname
Sewel (disambiguation)
Suwellel, a vernacular name of the mountain beaver (Aplodontia rufa)
Swell (disambiguation)
Sowell